The 1928 season was the first season of the Football League Jujeña. It was held between 16 February and 30 November 1928.  The league was, organized by the Argentine Football Association.

Dispute system 

The ten teams met in two groups of eight date with seven games on each date, the system of all against all. The games and locations were determined by lot using a selection algorithm, with exceptions where, for security reasons were designated arbitrarily.
Final standings was established by accumulating points.
participating clubs

These are the teams that make the Jujeña Football League.

San Salvador de Jujuy 
 Club Ciudad de Nieva
 Club Atlético Cuyaya
 Club Atlético General Lavalle
 Club Atlético Gorriti
 Club Deportivo Luján
 Palermo Club Sportivo
 Athletic Association La Viña
 Club Deportivo El Cruce
 General Belgrano Athletic Club
 Club Atlético Los Perales Trade

Regional football leagues in Argentina